The  Tennessee Titans season was the franchise's 45th season in the National Football League, the 55th overall and the 18th in the state of Tennessee. It marked the first under head coach Ken Whisenhunt, as well as the first full season following the death of longtime owner Bud Adams, who died during the 2013 season. The Titans finished the season with 10 consecutive losses to finish with a 2–14 record, not only tying the Tampa Bay Buccaneers for the league's worst record, but the Titans also suffered their worst season since 1994, when the franchise was known as the Houston Oilers.

2014 draft class

Draft trades
 The Titans traded their original second-round selection (No. 42 overall) to the Philadelphia Eagles in exchange for the Eagles' second- and fourth-round selections (Nos. 54 and 122 overall, respectively).
 The Titans traded their third-round selection (No. 77 overall), along with their 2013 second- and seventh-round selections to the San Francisco 49ers in exchange for the 49ers' 2013 second-round selection.
 The Titans traded their sixth- and seventh-round selections (Nos. 186 and 228 overall, respectively) to the Washington Redskins in exchange for the Redskins' sixth-round selection (No. 178 overall).

Staff
 Owner – KSA Industries
 Co-chairman – Susie Adams Smith 
 President/chairman/CEO – Thomas Smith
 Executive vice president/general manager –  Ruston Webster 
 Assistant director of football administration – Dennis Polian
 Vice president of player personnel – Lake Dawson
 Vice president of football administration – Vin Marino
 Director of college scouting – Blake Beddingfield
 Director of pro scouting – Brian Gardner
Head Coach
 Head coach – Ken Whisenhunt
Offensive Coaches
 Offensive coordinator – Jason Michael
 Quarterbacks – John McNulty
 Running backs – Sylvester Croom
 Wide receivers – Shawn Jefferson
 Assistant wide receivers – Kevin Patullo
 Tight ends – Mike Mularkey
 Assistant tight ends – Arthur Smith
 Offensive line – Bob Bostad
 Assistant offensive line – Mike Sullivan 
 Offensive assistant – Luke Steckel
Defensive Coaches
 Defensive coordinator – Ray Horton
 Defensive line – Giff Smith
 Assistant defensive line – Nick Eason
 Linebackers – Lou Spanos
Defensive Backs − Louie Cioffi
 Assistant secondary – Steve Brown
 Defensive quality control – Cannon Matthews
Special Teams Coaches
 Special teams – Nate Kaczor
 Assistant special teams – Steve Hoffman

Final roster

Team captains
The Titans named five captains by player vote and stated that the sixth captain spot would be a rotating process. 
Jake Locker (QB)
Nate Washington (WR)
Jurrell Casey (DE)
Wesley Woodyard (LB)
George Wilson (ST)

Schedule

Preseason

Regular season

Note: Intra-division opponents are in bold text.

Game summaries

Week 1: at Kansas City Chiefs

With the stunning win over the struggling Chiefs, the Titans started their season at 1-0.

Week 2: vs. Dallas Cowboys

The Cowboys routed the Titans 26-10, en route to the Cowboys' six game winning streak. With the loss, Tennessee fell to 1-1.

Week 3: at Cincinnati Bengals

The Bengals rolled over the Titans, 33-7. It was all Bengals from the beginning. They humiliated Tennessee, simply destroying them. With the humiliating loss, Tennessee fell to 1-2.

Week 4: at Indianapolis Colts

The Titans got blown out for a third straight week, losing to the rival Colts 41-17. This loss drops the Titans to 1-3 on the season, but they remain in third place in the AFC South, with the Jaguars' 33-14 loss to the Chargers.

Week 5: vs. Cleveland Browns

The Titans dominated the first half, leading 28-3 after two quarters. However, it wasn't enough, as the Browns stormed back in the second half to win 29-28. This was the largest road comeback in NFL history. With the bitter loss, the Titans fell to 1-4.

Week 6: vs. Jacksonville Jaguars

Coming off their humiliating loss to the Browns, the Titans stayed at home to take on the winless Jacksonville Jaguars. Tennessee edged the Jags out 16-14, improving to 2-4 while the Jaguars dropped to 0-6.

Week 7: at Washington Redskins

Coming off their divisional home win over the Jaguars, the Titans traveled to FedEx field to take on the lowly Washington Redskins. The Redskins knocked off Tennessee, 19-17, dropping the Titans to 2-5 on the season.

Week 8: vs. Houston Texans

Hoping to rebound from their loss to the Redskins, the Titans stayed home to face the divisional rival Houston Texans. The Texans were on the rise and defeated the Titans, 30-16, dropping them to 2-6.

Week 10: at Baltimore Ravens

Coming off their home loss to the Texans, the Titans traveled to Baltimore to face the Ravens. The Ravens scored three touchdowns en route to a 21-7 victory over the Titans, dropping them to a dismal 2-7.

Week 11: vs. Pittsburgh Steelers

Coming off their loss to the Ravens, the Titans stayed home for a Week 11 Monday Night Football clash with the rival Pittsburgh Steelers. The Steelers ended up winning the contest, 27-24, dropping the Titans to 2-8.

Week 12: at Philadelphia Eagles

The Eagles definitively beat the Titans, 43-24, dropping them to 2-9. With their fifth straight loss, the Titans secured a third straight non-winning season.

Week 13: at Houston Texans

J.J. Watt dominated this game, as the Texans swept their rivals with a 45-21 victory. With the loss, the Titans stumbled to 2-10.

Week 14: vs. New York Giants

The Titans were the only AFC South team to lose to all of their NFC East opponents. With the loss, the Titans fell to 2–11.

Week 15: vs. New York Jets

This was the first game in NFL history to end with a final score of 16–11. With the loss, the Titans fell to 2–12.

Week 16: at Jacksonville Jaguars

The Jaguars bested their divisional rivals by a score of 21–13, With the loss, the Titans fell to 2–13.

Week 17: vs. Indianapolis Colts

With the loss and the Saints win over the Buccaneers, Titans ended up at 2–14, tying with the Buccaneers. Titans earned the second pick in the 2015 NFL Draft.

Standings

Division

Conference

References

External links
 
 

Tennessee
Tennessee Titans seasons
Titans